Wesley College, Colombo, popularly known as "Wesley" or "The Double Blues" is a school providing primary and secondary education in Sri Lanka since 1874. Wesley College is a Methodist educational institution.

History 

In 1858, Rev. Joseph Rippon wanted to establish a superior educational institution for the Wesleyan Methodist Mission in South Ceylon. On 2 March 1874 (the death anniversary of Rev. John Wesley) Wesley College was founded in the City Mission buildings at Dam Street, Pettah. Wesley's first principal was Rev. Samuel R. Wilkin and the first vice-principal was Rev. D. Henry Pereira.

Many years later, under the guiding hand of Rev. Henry Highfield, Wesley was moved from Dam Street, Pettah to its current residence at Karlsruhe Gardens, Borella in 1907.

The Methodist institution was envisaged to be a distinctly Christian college, however it currently provides secondary education for over three thousand Sri Lankan students from diverse religious and ethnic backgrounds.

Wesley College has since established two branches to accommodate its growing number of students. One branch is situated in Havelock Town, Colombo while the other is in Thampola, Katunayake.

Wesley College is named after John Wesley (1703–1791), the founder of the Methodist Church.

Houses 
Suggested by Rev. Henry Highfield and introduced by Rev Albert Hutchinson during his Principalship, Wesley College has 4 main houses, which were further divided by Mr C. J. Oorloff as senior houses and junior houses during his Principalship. The houses are named after former Principals and Teachers who provided extraordinary service to the school, and remain firm pillars of its proud history. The houses are named as follows.

 Senior house-Wilkin / Junior house-Dias.
 Senior house-Moscrop / Junior house-Lemphers.
 Senior house-Hillard / Junior house-Mack.
 Senior house-Passmore / Junior house-Honter.

Notable alumni

See also
 :Category:People associated with Wesley College, Colombo
 Schools in Sri Lanka
 Oldest Schools in Sri Lanka

References

External links
Official Website

1874 establishments in Ceylon
Educational institutions established in 1874
Methodist schools in Sri Lanka
Private schools in Sri Lanka
Schools in Colombo